The 2014–15 VfL Wolfsburg season was the 70th season in the club's football history. In the previous season, Wolfsburg had finished in the fifth place, with only one point separating them from the UEFA Champions League spot occupied by Bayer Leverkusen. Nevertheless, they were granted a place in the UEFA Europa League group stage.

Current squad
As of 15 September 2014

Players out on loan

Transfers

In

Out

Competitions

Bundesliga

League table

Results summary

Results by round

Matches

DFB-Pokal

UEFA Europa League

Group stage

Knockout phase

Round of 32

Round of 16

Quarterfinals

Statistics

Appearances and goals

|-
! colspan=12 style=background:#dcdcdc; text-align:center| Goalkeepers

|-
! colspan=12 style=background:#dcdcdc; text-align:center| Defenders

|-
! colspan=12 style=background:#dcdcdc; text-align:center| Midfielders

|-
! colspan=12 style=background:#dcdcdc; text-align:center| Forwards

|-
! colspan=12 style=background:#dcdcdc; text-align:center| Players transferred out during the season

Goalscorers
This includes all competitive matches.  The list is sorted by shirt number when total goals are equal.

Last updated on 30 May 2015

References

Wolfsburg
VfL Wolfsburg seasons
Wolfsburg, VfL